Monfumo is a comune (municipality) in the Province of Treviso in the Italian region Veneto, located about  northwest of Venice and about  northwest of Treviso.

Monfumo borders the following municipalities: Asolo, Castelcucco, Cavaso del Tomba, Cornuda, Maser, Pederobba.

Demographic evolution

References

Cities and towns in Veneto